Kickapoo Downtown Airport  is a city-owned public use airport located three nautical miles (6 km) south of the central business district of Wichita Falls, a city in Wichita County, Texas, United States.

Although most U.S. airports use the same three-letter location identifier for the FAA and IATA, this airport is assigned CWC by the FAA and KIP by the IATA (which assigned CWC to Chernovtsy Airport in Chernovtsy, Ukraine).

Facilities and aircraft 
It has one runway designated 17/35 with a concrete surface measuring 4,450 by 75 feet (1,356 x 23 m).

For the 12-month period ending August 12, 2008, the airport had 22,400 aircraft operations, an average of 61 per day: 99% general aviation and 1% air taxi. At that time there were 76 aircraft based at this airport: 64% single-engine, 29% multi-engine, 4% jet and 3% helicopter.

References

External links 
  at Texas DOT Airport Directory
 

Airports in Texas
Buildings and structures in Wichita County, Texas
Transportation in Wichita County, Texas